Angel Esquire is a 1919 British silent crime film directed by W. P. Kellino and starring Aurelio Sidney, Gertrude McCoy and Dick Webb. It is based on the 1908 novel Angel Esquire by Edgar Wallace, which was later turned into a 1964 German film The Curse of the Hidden Vault.

Premise
A millionaire leaves his fortune to whoever can discover the combination to unlock his safe.

Cast
 Aurelio Sidney as Jimmy
 Gertrude McCoy as Kathleen Kent
 Dick Webb as Angel
 W.T. Ellwanger as Spedding
 George Traill as Connor
 Cecil del Gue as Reale
 Florence Nelson as Mrs. Reale

References

Bibliography
 Low, Rachael. History of the British Film, 1918–1929. George Allen & Unwin, 1971.

1919 films
1919 crime films
British crime films
British silent feature films
Films based on British novels
Films based on works by Edgar Wallace
Films directed by W. P. Kellino
British black-and-white films
1910s English-language films
1910s British films